The 1952 Southern League was the first season of the newly created regional third tier of speedway racing in the United Kingdom for Southern British teams. From the defunct National League Division Three of the previous season, only Poole Pirates did not join the new league. Ipswich Witches and Southampton Saints were new entrants.

Rayleigh Rockets were champions whilst Long Eaton Archers withdrew mid-season. George Wall of Plymouth topped the averages.

Final table

Withdrawal (Record expunged) : Long Eaton Archers

Leading Averages

National Trophy Stage Three
 For Stage Two - see Stage Two
 For Stage Three - see Stage Three

The 1952 National Trophy was the 15th edition of the Knockout Cup. The Trophy consisted of three stages; stage one was for the third tier clubs, stage two was for the second tier clubs and stage three was for the top tier clubs. The winner of stage one would qualify for stage two and the winner of stage two would qualify for the third and final stage. Plymouth won stage one and therefore qualified for stage two.

Third Division qualifying first round

Third Division qualifying second round

Third Division qualifying semifinals

Qualifying final
First leg

Second leg

See also
List of United Kingdom Speedway League Champions
Knockout Cup (speedway)

References

Speedway Southern League
Speedway Southern
1952 in speedway